Diego Andrés Cerón Silva (born 15 September 1991) is a Chilean professional footballer who plays as a defender for San Marcos de Arica in the Segunda División Profesional de Chile.

Honours
Cobresal
 Primera División de Chile: 2015 Clausura

External links
 
 
 

1991 births
Living people
Footballers from Santiago
Chilean footballers
Association football defenders
Cobresal footballers
San Antonio Unido footballers
Malleco Unido footballers
Santiago Morning footballers
San Marcos de Arica footballers
Primera B de Chile players
Chilean Primera División players
Segunda División Profesional de Chile players